Andreas Lava Olsen (born 9 October 1987) is a Faroese international footballer who plays for Víkingur Gøta. From 2011 to 2013 he played for Boldklubben Frem in the Danish 1st Division while living in Denmark because of studies. After finishing his studies he returned to the Faroe Islands.

International goals

Scores and results list Faroe Islands' goal tally first.

References

External links
Andreas Olsen Boldklubben Frem profile and record 

1987 births
Living people
Faroese footballers
Faroe Islands international footballers
Boldklubben Frem players
Faroese expatriates in Iceland
Víkingur Gøta players
Expatriate footballers in Iceland
Association football wingers
Faroe Islands youth international footballers
Faroe Islands under-21 international footballers
Association football forwards